Gulab singh Rajpurohit is an Indian politician from the Bharatiya Janata Party representing the Sumerpur (Rajasthan Assembly constituency) from Rajasthan. He also won the election in 1990 and 1993 from the same Sumerpur constituency of Rajasthan from the BJP ticket.

References 

Living people
Bharatiya Janata Party politicians from Rajasthan
Rajasthan MLAs 2018–2023
Year of birth missing (living people)